Kituku is a city of the Democratic Republic of the Congo. As of 2012, it had an estimated population of 44,981.

References 

Democratic Republic of the Congo